Kentucky Pride is a 1925 American silent drama film from Fox Film about the life of a horse breeder and racer, directed by the famed film director John Ford and starring Henry B. Walthall (who had previously played the Little Colonel in D. W. Griffith's controversial 1915 film The Birth of a Nation). It is among Ford's lesser-known works, but has been praised for sweetness and charm and its beautiful depiction of the life of horses and the relationship between the protagonist and his daughter. Several well-known thoroughbred racehorses appear in the film, including the legendary Man o' War. A print of Kentucky Pride is in the Museum of Modern Art film archive.

Plot 
The plot concerns Beaumont, a horse breeder with a penchant for gambling, who is down on his luck. After losing at poker and being forced to give up several of his horses to cover his losses, Beaumont bets it all and loses again when his horse, Virginia's Future, suddenly falls and breaks a leg while leading the pack in a critical race. Beaumont's selfish wife tells the horse's trainer, Mike Donovan, to kill the injured horse, and abandons Beaumont for Greve Carter, a well-to-do neighbor. Beaumont also loses his relationship with Virginia, his daughter from his previous marriage. Beaumont and Donovan manage to save Virginia's Future, and she births a colt (or a filly) named Confederacy, but his financial troubles force him to sell off both the colt and the mare. Confederacy is mistreated by his new owner, a foreign junk dealer, and Virginia's Future is forced into hard labor as a pack horse. But when Confederacy is later entered to run in the Futurity, ridden by Mike Donovan's son Danny, Beaumont gathers everything he can and bets it all again. This time he wins. He is reunited with his daughter and buys back the colt, giving it a good life in the pasture.

Cast
 Gertrude Astor as Mrs. Beaumont, the selfish second wife of Mr. Beaumont
 Peaches Jackson as Beaumont's daughter Virginia
 J. Farrell MacDonald as Mike Donovan, horse trainer
 Winston Miller as Mike Donovan's son Danny
 Belle Stoddard as Mrs. Donovan
 Malcolm Waite as the neighbor Greve Carter
 Henry B. Walthall as Mr. Beaumont, the protagonist horse breeder
 George H. Reed
 Sayre Dearing as Racetrack Spectator (uncredited)

Several notable horses appeared in the film, including
 Man o' War, widely considered one of the greatest racehorses of all time, winner of the Preakness Stakes and Belmont Stakes and many other prominent races (not entered in the Kentucky Derby)
 Fair Play, sire of Man o' War and several other renowned thoroughbreds, progeny including Display, Mad Play, Ladkin, Mad Hatter, Chance Play, Chance Shot, and Fairmount
 Negofol, French-bred winner of the 1909 Prix de Guiche, sire of several famed horses including Coventry, Hourless, and Vito
 The Finn, winner of the 1915 Belmont Stakes and sire of Zev and Flying Ebony
 Morvich, winner of the 1922 Kentucky Derby (the first California-bred racehorse to win the Derby)

Reception
The New York Times failed to review the film at the time of its release. In later critical commentary, Joseph McBride said the film has "unexpected sweetness and charm", and Shigehiko Hasumi praised it for its beautiful depiction of the life of horses and the relationship between the protagonist and his daughter. Scott Eyman said "Kentucky Pride remains a shameless – shamelessly effective – film".

References

External links

1925 films
1920s sports drama films
American sports drama films
American silent feature films
American black-and-white films
Films directed by John Ford
Fox Film films
American horse racing films
Films with screenplays by Dorothy Yost
1925 drama films
1920s American films
Silent American drama films
1920s English-language films
Silent sports drama films